Paxtachi District is a district of Samarqand Region in Uzbekistan. The capital lies at the town Ziyovuddin.

The district consists of 7 urban-type settlements (Ziyovuddin, Qodirist, Past Burkut, Sanchiqul, Suluvqoʻrgʻon, Urgich, Xumor) and 8 rural communities.

References 

Samarqand Region
Districts of Uzbekistan